Several names of the United States of America are in common use. Alternatives to the full name include the "United States" and "America", as well as the initialisms "U.S." and the "U.S.A."; colloquial names include "the States" and the "U.S. of A." 

It is generally accepted that the name "America" derives from the Italian explorer Amerigo Vespucci. The term dates back to 1507, when it appeared on a world map created by the German cartographer Martin Waldseemüller, in honor of Vespucci, applied to the land that is now Brazil. The full name "United States of America" was first used during the American Revolutionary War, though its precise origin is a matter of contention. The newly formed union was first known as the "United Colonies", and the earliest known usage of the modern full name dates from a  letter written between two military officers. The Articles of Confederation, prepared by John Dickinson, and the Declaration of Independence, drafted by Thomas Jefferson, both contain the phrase "United States of America."

Etymology

America 

The earliest known use of the name "America" dates to 1505, when German poet Matthias Ringmann used it in a poem about the New World. The word is a Latinized form of the first name of Italian explorer Amerigo Vespucci, who first proposed that the West Indies discovered by Christopher Columbus in 1492 were part of a previously unknown landmass, rather than the eastern limit of Asia. On , the map Universalis Cosmographia, created by German cartographer Martin Waldseemüller, was published alongside this poem. The map uses the label "America" for what is now known as South America. In 1538, the Flemish cartographer Gerardus Mercator used the name "America" on his own world map, applying it to the entire Western Hemisphere.

Alternative theories suggest that "America" derives from the Amerrisque Mountains of Nicaragua, or from the surname of wealthy Anglo-Welsh merchant Richard Amerike.

United States of America 
Moylan was fulfilling Reed's role during the latter's absence. Moylan expressed his wish to go "with full and ample powers from the United States of America to Spain" to seek assistance in the Revolutionary War effort. It is commonly mistaken that Thomas Paine coined the term in his pamphlet Common Sense, published in January 1776, but he never used the final form.

The final version of the Articles, sent to the states for ratification in late 1777, stated that "The Stile of this Confederacy shall be 'The United States of America'." In June 1776, Thomas Jefferson wrote "UNITED STATES OF AMERICA" in all capitalized letters in the headline of his "original Rough draught" of the Declaration of Independence. This draft of the document did not surface until , and it is unclear whether it was written before or after Dickinson used the term in his June 17 draft of the Articles of Confederation. In any case, the Declaration of Independence was the first official document to use the nation's new title.

History 

In the early days of the American Revolution, the colonies as a unit were most commonly referred to as the "United Colonies". For example, president of the Continental Congress Richard Henry Lee wrote in a June 7, 1776 resolution: "These United Colonies are, and of right, ought to be, free and independent States." Before 1776, names for the colonies varied significantly; they included "Twelve United English Colonies of North America", "United Colonies of North America", and others. On September 9, 1776, the Second Continental Congress officially changed the nation's name to the "United States of America".

In the first few years of the United States, however, there remained some discrepancies of usage. In the Treaty of Alliance (1778) with France, the term "United States of North America" was used. In accordance with this usage, when the Congress was drawing bills of exchange for French commissioners on May 19, 1778, they decided to use this term. President of the Continental Congress Henry Laurens even wrote that "Congress have adopted the Stile of the Treaties of Paris, 'the United States of North America'." Congress, however, reconsidered this change on July 11, 1778 and resolved to drop "North" from the bills of exchange, making them consistent with the name adopted in 1776.

Since the Articles of Confederation, the concept of a Perpetual Union between the states has existed, and "Union" has become synonymous with "United States". This usage was especially prevalent during the Civil War, when it referred specifically to the loyalist northern states which remained part of the federal union.

The term "America" was seldom used in the United States before the 1890s, and rarely used by presidents before Theodore Roosevelt. It does not appear in patriotic songs composed during the eighteenth and nineteenth centuries, including "The Star-Spangled Banner", "My Country, 'Tis of Thee", and the "Battle Hymn of the Republic", although it is common in 20th-century songs like "God Bless America". The name "Columbia", popular in American poetry and songs of the late 18th century, derives its origin from Christopher Columbus. Many landmarks and institutions in the Western Hemisphere bear his name, including the country of Colombia and the District of Columbia.

Circa 1810, the term Uncle Sam was "a cant term in the army for the United States," according to a 1810 edition Niles' Weekly Register. Uncle Sam is now known as a national personification of the United States.

Usage as a singular noun 

The phrase "United States" was originally plural, a description of a collection of independent states—e.g., "the United States are"—including in the Thirteenth Amendment to the United States Constitution, ratified in 1865. The singular form became popular after the end of the Civil War, and is now standard. However, the plural form is retained in the idiom "these United States". The difference is more significant than usage; it is a difference between a collection of states and a unit.

The transition from plural to singular was gradual. In a May 4, 1901, column in the New York Times titled "ARE OR IS? Whether a Plural or Singular Verb Goes With the Words United States", former Secretary of State John W. Foster noted that early statesmen such as Alexander Hamilton and Daniel Webster had used the singular form, as well as the Treaty of Paris (1898) and Hay–Pauncefote Treaty of 1900; conversely, most Supreme Court decisions still used the plural form. He concludes that "since the civil war the tendency has been towards [singular] use." Mark Liberman of the University of Pennsylvania found that, in the corpus of Supreme Court opinions, the transition to singular usage occurred in the early 1900s. Among English-language books, the transition happened earlier, around 1880.

Usage 
The name "United States" is unambiguous; "United States of America" may be used in titles or when extra formality is desired. However, "United States" and "U.S." may be used adjectivally, while the full name cannot. English usage of "America" rarely refers to topics unrelated to the United States, despite the usage of "Americas" as the totality of North and South America. Colloquial names include the "U.S. of A." and, internationally, "the States". Even more informal names include "Murica" and "Merica", which imply a jocular and sometimes derogatory tone.

The official U.S. Government Publishing Office Style Manual prescribes specific usages for "U.S." and "United States". In treaties, congressional bills, etc., "United States" is always used. In a sentence containing the name of another country, "United States" must be used. Otherwise, "U.S." is used preceding a government organization or as an adjective, but "United States" is used as an adjective preceding non-governmental organizations (e.g. United States Steel Corporation).

Style guides conflict over how various names for the United States should be used. The Chicago Manual of Style, until the 17th edition, required "US" and "U.S." to be used as an adjective; it now permits the usage of both as a noun, though "United States" is still preferred in this case. The Associated Press Stylebook permits the usage of "US" and "U.S." as both adjectives and nouns, though "US" (without the periods) is only allowed in headlines. APA Style, in contrast, only allows "U.S." to be used as an adjective, and disallows "US".

Other languages 

In Spanish, the U.S. is known as Estados Unidos, literally "United States." The Americas are known simply as América. Spanish uses estadounidense and americano for the adjectival form, with the latter being mostly proscribed. In Chinese, the U.S. is known as 美国 (traditional: 美國). Literally "beautiful country," it in fact comes from the second character of the transliteration of America as "亚美利加" (traditional: 亞美利加). The Americas are known as 美洲, with the same etymology. In Japanese, the U.S. is known as アメリカ (Hepburn: amerika) and 米国 (Hepburn: beikoku), borrowing from Chinese. In Esperanto, the United States of America is known as "Usono", borrowing from English Usonia. In Burmese, the United States of America is known as အမေရိကန်ပြည်ထောင်စု (amerikan pyedaungsu), literally "American Union." In Kannada, the United States is known as "ಅಮೇರಿಕ ಸಂಯುಕ್ತ ಸಂಸ್ಥಾನ", literally "America's Union of States."

See also 
 American (word)
 Demonyms for the United States
 List of countries that include United States in their name

Notes

References 

United States
Constitutional history of the United States